Saffal Band (also Romanized as Saffāl Band and Safāl Band) is a village in Doreh Rural District, in the Central District of Sarbisheh County, South Khorasan Province, Iran. At the 2006 census, its population was 196, in 48 families.

References 

Populated places in Sarbisheh County